Roger Houdet (14 June 1899 – 25 August 1987) was a French engineer and politician.

1899 births
1987 deaths
People from Angers
French Ministers of Agriculture
20th-century French engineers
French people of the Algerian War
Senators of Seine-Maritime